Shrimati or Shreemati, abbreviated Smt., is a widely accepted Indian honorific (akin to Mrs. in English) used when referring to an adult woman in some Indian languages, including Bengali, Hindi, Kannada, Tamil, Malayalam, Odia, Sanskrit, Telugu, Tulu, and sometimes in English as well (in an Indian context). The equivalent title for men is Shri or Sri, which is a shortened version of Shriman or Shreeman.

References 

Titles in India
Women's social titles